The SMU Mustangs college football team competes in the National Collegiate Athletic Association (NCAA) Division I Football Bowl Subdivision, representing Southern Methodist University in the West Division of the American Athletic Conference. Since the team's inaugural season in 1915, SMU has appeared in 17 post-season bowl games.

In the 17 bowl appearances, SMU has accumulated a record of 7 wins, 9 losses, and 1 tie.

After finishing the 2020 regular season with a 7–3 record, the Mustangs accepted a bid to play in the Frisco Bowl, where they were due to face the UTSA Roadrunners. On December 14, the Mustangs withdrew from the game, due to COVID-19 issues; the bowl was subsequently canceled.

After finishing the 2021 regular season with an 8–4 record, the Mustangs accepted a bid to play in the Fenway Bowl, where they were due to face the Virginia Cavaliers. On December 26, the Cavaliers withdrew from the game, due to COVID-19 issues; the bowl was subsequently canceled.

Bowl appearances

References

SMU Mustangs

SMU Mustangs bowl games
SMU Mustangs bowl games